Clive is a name. People and fictional characters with the name include:

People

Given name
 Clive Allen (born 1961), English football player
 Clive Anderson (born 1952), British television, radio presenter, comedy writer and former barrister
 Clive Barker (born 1952), English writer, film director and visual artist
 Clive Barker (artist, born 1940), British pop artist
 Clive Barker (soccer) (born 1944), South African coach
 Clive Barnes (1927–2008), English writer and critic, dance and theater critic for The New York Times
 Clive Bell (1881–1964), English art critic
 Clive Brook (1887–1974), British film actor
 Clive Burr (1957–2013), British musician, former drummer with Iron Maiden
 Clive Campbell (footballer), New Zealand footballer in the 1970s and early '80s
 Clive Campbell (born 1955), Jamaican-born DJ with the stage name DJ Kool Herc
 Clive Clark (golfer) (born 1945), English golfer
 Clive Clark (footballer) (1940–2014), English former footballer
 Clive Clarke (born 1980), Irish footballer
 Clive Coates (born 1941), British wine writer and Master of Wine
 Clive Cussler (1931-2020), American novelist and underwater explorer
 Clive Davis (born 1932), American record producer
 Clive Evans (footballer) (born 1957), English former footballer
 Clive Evans (fashion designer) (born 1933), London fashion designer of the 1960s, better known as 'Clive'
 Clive Hirschhorn (born 1940), South African writer and critic, longtime film and theater critic
 Clive James (1939–2019), Australian author, critic, broadcaster, poet, translator and memoirist
 Clive Jones (rugby), Welsh rugby union and rugby league footballer of the 1970s
 Clive Lewis (disambiguation)
 Clive Owen (born 1964), English actor
 Clive Sinclair (1940-2021), British entrepreneur and inventor
 Clive Smith (footballer, born 1923) (1923–1999), Australian rules footballer
 Clive A. Smith (born 1944), British director and animator, co-founder of the Canadian animation studio Nelvana
 Clive Soley, Baron Soley (born 1939), British politician
 Clive A. Stace (born 1938), British botanist
 Clive Stafford Smith (born 1959), British attorney
 Clive Strutt (born 1942), English composer
 Clive Thompson (businessman) (born 1943), Deputy Chairman of Strategic Equity Capital
 Clive Thompson (journalist) (born 1968), Canadian freelance journalist, blogger and science and technology writer
 Clive Williams (rugby union) (born 1948), Welsh rugby union player
 Clive Williams (professor) (born 1945), British-born former Australian Army Military Intelligence officer and academic

Surname
 Caroline Clive (1801–1873), English writer
 Colin Clive (1900–1937), English stage and screen actor
 Edward Clive (disambiguation)
 E. E. Clive (1879–1940), Welsh stage actor and director
 Robert Clive (1725–1774), British officer and soldier of fortune who established the military and political supremacy of the East India Company in Bengal, Commander-in-Chief of British India
 Robert Clive (1769–1833), MP for Ludlow, son of the above
 Robert Clive (1789–1854), MP for Ludlow and Shropshire South, nephew of the above and grandson of Lord Clive
 Robert Clive (diplomat) (1877–1948), diplomat, British Ambassador to Belgium

Places
 Clive, a small town in New Zealand
 Clive River, a small river in New Zealand

Fictional characters 
 Clive, in Beyond the Black Stump (comic strip)
 Clive, in "Rose" (Doctor Who episode)
 Clive, a Garfield character
 Clive Gibbons, in the Australian soap opera Neighbours
 Clive Jones (Doctor Who), in the British TV series Doctor Who
 Clive Vickers, a character in Brotherhood of Mutants

See also
Geoffrey de Clive (died 1119), Roman Catholic Bishop of Hereford
Statue of Robert Clive, London

References

English-language masculine given names
English masculine given names